Gary Wayne Alexander (born March 27, 1953) is an American former professional baseball player. He played in Major League Baseball (MLB) as a catcher from 1975 through 1981 for the San Francisco Giants, Oakland Athletics, Cleveland Indians and Pittsburgh Pirates.

Alexander was traded along with Gary Thomasson, Dave Heaverlo, John Henry Johnson, Phil Huffman, Alan Wirth and $300,000 from the Giants to the Athletics for Vida Blue on March 15, . Mario Guerrero was sent to the Athletics on April 7 to complete the transaction. Alexander was dealt again three months later at the trade deadline on June 15 when he went from the Athletics to the Indians for Joe Wallis. On September 26, 1978, his home run with two outs in the ninth inning ended a no-hit bid by Mike Flanagan of the Baltimore Orioles. 

In a seven-season major league career, Alexander posted a .230 batting average with 55 home runs and 202 RBI in 432 games played. His best statistical season was in 1978 when he hit 27 home runs and had 84 RBI's, 57 runs, 112 hits and 20 doubles in 148 games played, all career-highs. 

Alexander is now a captain in the Los Angeles (CA) Fire Department.

References

External links

1953 births
Living people
African-American baseball players
American expatriate baseball players in Mexico
Águilas Cibaeñas players
American expatriate baseball players in the Dominican Republic
Azules de Coatzacoalcos players
Bradenton Explorers players
Cardenales de Lara players
American expatriate baseball players in Venezuela
Cleveland Indians players
Decatur Commodores players
Fresno Giants players
Great Falls Giants players
Lafayette Drillers players
Leones de Yucatán players
Leones del Escogido players
Los Angeles Harbor Seahawks baseball players
Major League Baseball catchers
Oakland Athletics players
Phoenix Giants players
Pittsburgh Pirates players
San Francisco Giants players
Baseball players from Los Angeles
21st-century African-American people
20th-century African-American sportspeople